Rockall is a small, uninhabited, remote rocky islet in the North Atlantic Ocean.

Rockall may also refer to:

 Rockall Basin, sedimentary basin to the west of Ireland and the UK beneath a major deepwater area (Rockall Trough) named after the islet
 Rockall, a BBC Radio Shipping Forecast area named after the islet
 The Band from Rockall, another band named for the islet and eponymous album
 Rockall score, attempt to identify patients at risk of adverse outcome following acute upper gastrointestinal bleeding
 Taryn Rockall (born 1977), Australian football (soccer) player

See also
 Island of Rockall Act 1972, British Act of Parliament formally incorporating the island into the UK to protect it from Irish and Icelandic claims
 Seán Dublin Bay Rockall Loftus (1927-2010), Irish environmentalist, barrister and politician
 Rockwall (disambiguation)